Gordon Alec Hill (born 1 April 1954) is an English former footballer who played in the Football League for Millwall, Manchester United, Derby County and Queens Park Rangers, and was capped six times for the England national team.

Player
In 1971, after leaving Longford School, Hill began his club career with Staines Town of the Athenian League as a 17-year-old. In 1972, he moved to Southall F.C., playing a few youth games there while his brother was on trial at the club. He drew the attention of Millwall F.C. and signed with them in 1973. Known to The Lions fans as 'Merlin', Hill had outstanding skill that earned him wide recognition. The Millwall youngster entertained the fans with high-class shooting and dribbling and it was not long before scouts from big clubs noticed him. He played 91 league games for Millwall, scoring 22 goals. After spending the summer of 1975 on loan with the North American Soccer League's Chicago Sting, and being named All League, Hill subsequently signed for Manchester United in November 1975 for £70,000, a bargain for manager Tommy Docherty, forming a wing partnership with Steve Coppell.

Hill helped United reach the 1976 FA Cup Final, scoring both goals with typical long-range efforts in the semi-final at Hillsborough Stadium against Derby County. Unfortunately for Hill, United lost in the Final against Southampton. He was also part of the 1977 FA Cup-winning side. Hill left United for Derby County for £250,000 in 1978, with his sale by Dave Sexton deeply unpopular with supporters. At the time of his sale, Hill was United's top scorer and a favourite among fans. He spent two seasons with Derby County, most of it sidelined with a knee injury suffered in one of his first games, before moving to Queens Park Rangers in 1979. He left England for the Montreal Manic of the NASL in 1981. After a successful first season with the Manic, he began the 1982 season in Montreal, but after five games the Manic sent him to the Chicago Sting. In the fall of 1982, the Sting entered the Major Indoor Soccer League for the winter indoor season. Hill began the season with the Sting, and moved to the San Jose Earthquakes after eleven games. In January 1983, the Earthquakes turned around and traded Hill and Gary Etherington to the New York Arrows in exchange for Steve Zungul. In the summer of 1983, Hill played for Inter-Montreal of the Canadian Professional Soccer League. In the autumn of 1983, Hill signed with the Kansas City Comets of MISL. He played one season with the Comets, then began the 1984–85 season before being released. In December 1984, he signed with the Tacoma Stars.

He joined FC Twente in the Dutch Premier Division for the 1985–86 season, playing 19 times and scoring four goals. He spent the summer of 1986 in Finland with HJK Helsinki, scoring two goals in as many appearances before returning to England where he played under his former teammate Stuart Pearson at Northwich Victoria, before retiring from the game.

Manager
In the summer of 1991, Hill was managing director, Head Coach and Player of the Nova Scotia Clippers in the team's only year in the Canadian Soccer League, where he took the club to the playoffs. In 2001, he briefly managed Chester City during their spell in the Football Conference, and had a short spell managing Hyde United. He was the Director of coaching (Boys) for Cleveland United SC 2012–13. Hill admits that any promising players would be steered towards his former team.

He returns to the UK several times a year with groups of players to play games in the Manchester area.

International career
During his career, Hill played at every level for England: as an amateur, youth, under 23, England B and full International, at which level he won six full caps between 1976 and 1977.

Honours

Club
Manchester United
FA Cup: 1976–77
FA Charity Shield: 1977

Individual
NASL 1st All-Star team: 1975
Manchester United top scorer: 1976–77, 1977–78

References

External links
 England stats
 North American Soccer League bio
 Bio – sporting-heroes.net

1954 births
Living people
Canadian Professional Soccer League (original) players
Canadian Soccer League (1987–1992) players
Chester City F.C. managers
Chicago Sting (MISL) players
Chicago Sting (NASL) players
Derby County F.C. players
England international footballers
England B international footballers
England under-23 international footballers
English expatriate footballers
English expatriate sportspeople in Canada
English expatriate sportspeople in the United States
English footballers
English Football League players
English football managers
Eredivisie players
Expatriate footballers in Finland
Expatriate footballers in the Netherlands
Expatriate soccer players in Canada
Expatriate soccer players in the United States
FC Twente players
Helsingin Jalkapalloklubi players
Hyde United F.C. managers
Inter-Montreal players
Kansas City Comets (original MISL) players
Major Indoor Soccer League (1978–1992) players
Manchester United F.C. players
Millwall F.C. players
Montreal Manic players
New York Arrows players
North American Soccer League (1968–1984) players
North American Soccer League (1968–1984) indoor players
Northwich Victoria F.C. players
Nova Scotia Clippers players
People from Sunbury-on-Thames
Queens Park Rangers F.C. players
San Jose Earthquakes (1974–1988) players
Southall F.C. players
Stafford Rangers F.C. players
Tacoma Stars players
Association football midfielders
FA Cup Final players